The 1925 Montana Grizzlies football team was an American football team that represented the University of Montana  as a member of the Pacific Coast Conference (PCC) during the 1925 PCC football season. In its second year under head coach Earl Clark, the team compiled a 3–4–1 record (1–4 against PCC opponents.  The team played its home games at Dornblaser Field in Missoula, Montana.

Schedule

References

Montana
Montana Grizzlies football seasons
Montana Grizzlies football